Inahata Teiko (8 January 1931 – 27 February 2022) was a Japanese haiku poet, essayist and literary critic.

Life and career 
Born in Yokohama, the granddaughter of poet Kyoshi Takahama and the daughter of poet , Inahata had been composing haiku since she was still a child. She studied at Kobayashi Seishin Women's College. 

Inahata published her first collection of haiku in 1976. In 1979 she succeeded her father as editor-in-chief of the literary magazine Hototogisu, and was editor of the newspaper The Asahi Shimbun. She was a Catholic. 

Inahata died in Ashiya, Hyōgo Prefecture on 27 February 2022, at the age of 91.

References

External links
 Teiko Inahata at OpenLibrary

1931 births
2022 deaths
Japanese women poets
Writers from Kanagawa Prefecture
People from Yokohama